Paul Ouckram (23 March 1889 – 16 March 1937) was a Guyanese cricketer. He played in four first-class matches for British Guiana from 1909 to 1925.

See also
 List of Guyanese representative cricketers

References

External links
 

1889 births
1937 deaths
Guyanese cricketers
Guyana cricketers